Joachim "Jochen" Büchner (8 April 1905 – 22 February 1978) was a German sprint runner who won a bronze medal in the 400 m event at the 1928 Olympics. He failed to reach the 400 m final at the next Olympics, and finished in fourth place with the German  4 × 400 m relay team. He won three national titles in the 400 m in 1927–1929 and finished second in 1925, 1931 and 1932. In 1928 he became the first German athlete to run 400 m within 48 seconds.

Büchner was a graphic designer and advertising consultant. After retiring from competitions, he worked at ASV Köln, first as athletics coach (1947–1950), then treasurer (1962–1969) and later as president (1969–1977). Until his death in 1978 he was a member of the Association of Former Track and Field Athletes of West Germany. Büchner's daughter Christa (born 1931) became a pentathlete.

References

External links
 

1905 births
1978 deaths
Athletes (track and field) at the 1928 Summer Olympics
Athletes (track and field) at the 1932 Summer Olympics
German male sprinters
Olympic athletes of Germany
Olympic bronze medalists for Germany
People from Altenburg
People from Saxe-Altenburg
Place of birth missing
Medalists at the 1928 Summer Olympics
Olympic bronze medalists in athletics (track and field)
Sportspeople from Thuringia